The Queen Alexandra Range is a major mountain range of the Transantarctic Mountains System, located in the Ross Dependency region of Antarctica.

Alternate names for this range include Alexandra Mountains, Alexandra Range and Königin Alexandra Gebirge.

Other peaks in the range include Mount Dickerson (4,120 m).

Discovery
This mountain range was discovered on the journey toward the South Pole by the British Antarctic Expedition, and was named by Ernest Shackleton for Queen consort Alexandra of the United Kingdom.  Shackleton and his men, and a later expedition headed by Robert Falcon Scott, both collected rock samples from the range that contained fossils.  The discovery that multicellular life forms had lived so close to the South Pole was an additional piece of evidence that accompanied the publication (in 1910 and independently in 1912) of the theory of continental drift.

Mountains and peaks

Ahmadjian Peak 
Ahmadjian Peak is a prominent ice-covered peak, standing 4.5 miles (7 km) southwest of Mount Fox. Named by Advisory Committee on Antarctic Names (US-ACAN) for Vernon Ahmadjian, United States Antarctic Research Program (USARP) biologist at McMurdo Station, 1963–64.

Mount Bishop 
Named by US-ACAN after Lieutenant Barry Chapman Bishop (1932–94), United States Air Force (USAF), an observer with the Argentine Antarctic Expedition (1956–57); member of the Staff of the U.S. Antarctica Projects Officer, 1958 and 1959; member of the American party which on May 22, 1962, succeeded in climbing Mount Everest.

Decennial Peak 
Decennial Peak is a peak situated 4.8 km (3 mi) southwest of Mount Kirkpatrick. Mapped by United States Geological Survey (USGS) from surveys and U.S. Navy air photos, 1958–65. Named by US-ACAN in recognition of the Decennial of the Institute of Polar Studies, Ohio State University, in 1970, the same year the university celebrated its Centennial. The university and the Institute have been very active in Antarctic investigations since 1960.

Mount Elizabeth 
Mount Elizabeth is a large ice-free mountain 4,480 metres high situated 6 mi south of Mount Anne. Discovered by the British Antarctic Expedition and named for Elizabeth Dawson-Lambton, a supporter of the BAE.

Mount Fox 
Mount Fox is a mountain standing 1 mi SW of Mount F. L. Smith. Discovered and named by the British Antarctic Expedition.

Mount Ida 
Mount Ida is a conspicuous bare rock mountain, standing 2 miles (3.2 km) west of Granite Pillars, just southeast of the head of King Glacier. Discovered by the British Antarctic Expedition (1907–09), and named for Ida Jane Rule of Christchurch, New Zealand, who later married Edward Saunders, Secretary to Shackleton, who assisted in preparing the narrative of the expedition.

Mount Stanley 
Mount Stanley stands northeast of the head of Wyckoff Glacier near the western limits of Grindley Plateau. Named by the British Antarctic Expedition (1907–09) for the eldest brother of Dr. E.S. Marshall, a member of the expedition. This identification is the New Zealand Geological Survey Antarctic Expedition (NZGSAE) (1961–62) interpretation of the original positioning by the British Antarctic Expedition (1907–09).

Morris Heights 
Morris Heights is a relatively smooth ice-covered heights, forming a peninsula-like divide between Beaver and King Glaciers at the north end of Queen Alexandra Range. Named by Advisory Committee on Antarctic Names (US-ACAN) for Lieutenant Clarence T. Morris, U.S. Navy, aerology officer on the staff of the Commander, U.S. Naval Support Force, Antarctica, 1962 and 1963.

See also
Elliot Peak
Peterson Ridge

References

Mountain ranges of the Ross Dependency
Transantarctic Mountains
Shackleton Coast